, sometimes referred to as Jumping Flash! 3, is a 3D platform game for the Sony PlayStation. It was developed by Sugar & Rockets and published by Sony Computer Entertainment for the PlayStation in Japan on October 14, 1999. It is the third and final game in the Jumping Flash! series. The game was later released on the Japanese PlayStation Network on July 26, 2007.

Story
The inhabitants of planet Hananuma find themselves encountering numerous problems that they are unable to solve alone, and their call for help is answered by the Universal City Service, who send Robbit to Hananuma to rectify things and put the inhabitants at peace once again.

Gameplay
The gameplay controls are virtually identical to the two previous games, with the reduction of special weapons slots from three to one, and the addition of a slamming move after pressing the triangle button while in the air. Instead of roaming around worlds collecting Jet Pods or MuuMuus, the objective of each level varies from having to simply turn on four water wells to destroy thirteen ghosts in a graveyard to transporting somebody home.

Reception
Robbit Mon Dieu was generally well received by fans, but less than its predecessors. It was given a 31 out of 40 by gaming publication Famitsu. The game was given a 5.4 out of 10 by the website GameSpot, citing it as a disappointing sequel to the series.

References

External links
Robbit Mon Dieu at MobyGames

1999 video games
3D platform games
Japan-exclusive video games
PlayStation (console) games
PlayStation (console)-only games
Sony Interactive Entertainment games
Video game sequels
Video games about rabbits and hares
Video games developed in Japan